Guy Kennedy was an American college football coach at Oregon State University, then known as State Agricultural College.

Collegiate coaching
In 1894, Guy Kennedy became the second head coach for Oregon State.  He served as the head coach for just one season.  He went 2–1 in that season.  The most notable win in his three game season, was against the University of Oregon.  SAC prevailed in the first Oregon–Oregon State football rivalry game, 16–0, played at College Field on Lower Campus on the SAC campus.

Head coaching record

Notes
i. ^  This name may be inaccurate.  The Oregon State football media guide lists three different names for this coach. "Guy Kenney", "Gary Kennedy", and "Guy Kennedy" are all used.  Other sources equally dispute the name.

References

Year of birth missing
Year of death missing
Oregon State Beavers football coaches